

The LIPNUR Kunang was a single-seat sports aircraft built in Indonesia that first flew in 1958 in the hope that it would inspire interest in aviation amongst Indonesian youth. The only example that was built was subsequently grounded. It was a single-seat monoplane of conventional layout with fixed tailwheel undercarriage.

Aircraft on display
The sole prototype is now on display at the Satriamandala Museum, Jakarta. Some source claimed that the aircraft on display is a replica.

Specifications

See also

References

 
 
 
 Harapan dan Tanggapan Pemerhati dan Mitra 

1950s Indonesian sport aircraft
Aircraft first flown in 1958